Edgar Rosenberg (September 21, 1925 – August 14, 1987) was a German-born British film and television producer based in the U.S.

Early life
Edgar Rosenberg was born to Jewish parents in Bremerhaven in 1925. When he was a small boy, his family emigrated from Germany to Denmark and then South Africa to escape the Nazis. He was educated in England at Rugby School and Cambridge University.

Career
Rosenberg moved to the United States as a young man and rose to become an assistant to Emanuel Sacks, vice president of entertainment at NBC, but was fired during a year of recovery from a traffic accident and had to work as a night clerk in a bookstore. In the 1960s, he worked for the public relations firm run by Anna M. Rosenberg (to whom he was not related) and was a valued news source for journalists.

As a co-founder of the nonprofit Telsun Foundation production company affiliated with the United Nations, he helped to develop a series of television films promoting the United Nations, one of which, The Poppy Is Also a Flower (1966), was also released to theaters as a feature film. His other television credits included the 1950s U.S. educational TV series Omnibus and the short-lived 1970s sitcom Husbands, Wives & Lovers, which was created by his wife, Joan Rivers.

In the 1970s, he produced the feature film Rabbit Test (1978), written and directed by Rivers. He served as Rivers' manager for most of their marriage and was a producer on The Late Show Starring Joan Rivers, on the newly formed Fox Television Network.

Personal life and death
Rosenberg married actress, comedian and commentator Joan Rivers in July 1965, five days after hiring her to work with him in Jamaica rewriting a screenplay for a joint movie deal with his friend Peter Sellers. The couple had one daughter, Melissa Rivers.

In August 1987, several months after Fox fired him and Rivers, Rosenberg died by suicide, overdosing on prescription drugs in a  Philadelphia hotel room. He had been clinically depressed, which Rivers believed was brought on by medication he had been taking since a heart attack in 1984. Nancy Reagan was the first person to telephone Rivers upon Rosenberg's death, and arranged for his body to be moved from Philadelphia.

References

External links

 

1925 births
1987 suicides
People from Bremerhaven
Jewish emigrants from Nazi Germany to the United States
Alumni of the University of Cambridge
American film producers
American television producers
Drug-related suicides in Pennsylvania
Suicides in Philadelphia
Joan Rivers
People educated at Rugby School
Jewish emigrants from Nazi Germany to South Africa